Yekusiel Yehuda Teitelbaum (I), known as the Yetev Lev
 Congregation Yetev Lev D'Satmar (Hooper Street, Brooklyn)
 Congregation Yetev Lev D'Satmar (Rodney Street, Brooklyn)

See also 
 Congregation Yetev Lev D'Satmar (disambiguation)